Jane Chance (born 1945), also known as Jane Chance Nitzsche, is an American scholar specializing in medieval English literature, gender studies, and J. R. R. Tolkien. She spent most of her career at Rice University, where since her retirement she has been the Andrew W. Mellon Distinguished Professor Emerita in English.

Education and career
Chance earned her BA from Purdue University in 1967 and her MA (1968) and PhD (1971) from the University of Illinois at Urbana–Champaign.

She taught at the University of Saskatchewan and then moved to Rice University in 1973 to teach Old English literature; she was the first woman appointed to a tenure-track position in the English department there. She was appointed to the Andrew W. Mellon Professorship in 2008 and became emerita upon her retirement in 2011. She is founder president of the Consortium for the Teaching of the Middle Ages.

At Rice, Chance established what became the Medieval Studies Program and also headed the first Women's Studies program within the English department, which was nationally noted. In the late 1980s she was the  first president of the Rice Commission on Women. She unsuccessfully sued the university for gender discrimination in 1988. In 1995 she established and funded the Julia Mile Chance Prize for Excellence in Teaching, named for her mother, to honor women faculty members.

Publications

Comparative literature and medievalism 

As Jane Chance Nitzsche, Chance published a revised version of her dissertation as The Genius Figure in Antiquity and the Middle Ages in 1975. Beginning in 1994, she then published a three-volume history of medieval mythography. Volume 1, From Roman North Africa to the School of Chartres, A.D. 433–1177, was termed "monumental" and "highly detailed" by a reviewer in Arthuriana who nonetheless found the focus on gender poorly supported; although the reviewer in Speculum called it "disappointing"; Volume 2, From the School of Chartres to the Court at Avignon, 1177–1350, was called "immensely learned and ambitious" in the same journal in 2002. The final volume, The Emergence of Italian Humanism, 1321–1475, appeared in 2015, and was judged by one reviewer to be less comprehensive than claimed. In 1995 she also published Mythographic Chaucer: the Fabulation of Sexual Politics.

Other works in which Chance focuses on medieval women and gender studies include Woman as Hero in Old English Literature (1986), which investigated, among other things, the concept of women as peace-weavers and their frequent failure, and The Literary Subversions of Medieval Women (2007); she edited Gender and Text in the Later Middle Ages (1996) and Women Medievalists and the Academy (2005), which Helen Damico, writing in JEGP, called "massive in size and major in significance".

Tolkien scholarship 

Chance is a leading Tolkien scholar. Her books in this field include Tolkien's Art: A 'Mythology for England'  (1979; revised edition 2001), The Lord of the Rings: The Mythology of Power (1992; revised edition 2001), in which she uses the theoretical framework of Michel Foucault, Tolkien and the Invention of Myth: A Reader (2004), and Tolkien, Self and Other: "This Queer Creature" (2016), a biography with literary analysis.

Honors
Chance was awarded a Guggenheim Fellowship in 1980 and has also received membership in the Institute for Advanced Study in Princeton, New Jersey.

She won SCMLA Best Book awards for both the Medieval Mythography series and The Literary Subversions of Medieval Women.

In 2013 she was awarded an honorary doctorate of letters from Purdue University and honored in a symposium at the International Congress on Medieval Studies organized by the Medieval Foremothers' Society.

References

External links
 Personal page at Rice University

1945 births
Living people
Rice University faculty
Academic staff of the University of Saskatchewan
American medievalists
Women medievalists
Anglo-Saxon studies scholars
Gender studies academics
Purdue University alumni
University of Illinois Urbana-Champaign alumni
American women historians
Tolkien studies